The 1975–76 Washington Capitals season was the Washington Capitals second season in the National Hockey League (NHL). They improved by three games over their dreadful previous season, faring worse than the Kansas City Scouts, who went 12–56–12 (while going 1–2–1 against them), although the latter would move to Colorado after the season while the Capitals remained in their location.

Offseason

Regular season

Final standings

Schedule and results

Playoffs
Despite a slightly improved record from the previous season, the Capitals failed to qualify for the playoffs for the second year in a row.

Player statistics

Regular season
Scoring

Goaltending

Note: GP = Games played; G = Goals; A = Assists; Pts = Points; +/- = Plus/minus; PIM = Penalty minutes; PPG=Power-play goals; SHG=Short-handed goals; GWG=Game-winning goals
      MIN=Minutes played; W = Wins; L = Losses; T = Ties; GA = Goals against; GAA = Goals against average; SO = Shutouts;

Awards and records

Transactions

Draft picks
Washington's draft picks at the 1975 NHL Amateur Draft held in Montreal, Quebec.

Farm teams

See also
1975–76 NHL season

References

External links
 

Washington Capitals seasons
Wash
Wash
Washing
Washing